Liam is a male first name.

Liam may also refer to:

Liam#People
 Liam (2000 film), a British film directed by Stephen Frears
 Liam (2018 film), a French documentary film by Isidore Bethel
 "Liam", a song by the German band In Extremo
 "Liam", a song by Swedish DJ Eric Prydz from his album Opus
 Liam, a mascot of Yahoo! Mail
 Liam MacCarthy Cup, a trophy awarded by the Gaelic Athletic Association to the hurling team that wins the All-Ireland Senior Hurling Championship
 Liam and Me, an American rock band
 Liam the Leprechaun, a character appears in YouTube comedy series Annoying Orange